Parerastria is a monotypic moth genus of the family Noctuidae. Its only species, Parerastria castaneata, is found in the Australian states of Queensland and New South Wales. Both the species and the genus were first described by Warren in 1914.

References

Acontiinae
Monotypic moth genera